Jacopo Caldora or Giacomo Caldora (1369 – November 15, 1439) was an Italian condottiero.

Biography 
Jacopo Caldora was born in Castel del Giudice (Abruzzo in present-day Molise, then part of the Kingdom of Naples), into a feudatory family. He began his military career under Braccio da Montone, and, returned to his lands, expanded them by hiring mercenaries from the surrounding mountains. Called to the Neapolitan court by Queen Joan II of Anjou, he became a favourite of the powerful minister Sergianni Caracciolo.

He was the Feudal Lord of Anversa, Arce, Bari, Campo di Giove, Monteodorisio, Pacentro, Palena, Trivento, Valva and Vasto.

Jacopo was the son of Giovanni Antonio Caldora, and Rita Cantelmo, a noblewoman of the powerful Cantelmo Family of French origin. He had two brothers, Restaino and Raimondo.

In the political turmoil of the period, Caldora later became a general of Alfonso V of Aragon in his conquest of the Kingdom. When the Aragonese troops were left under siege in Naples, he changed sides again, winning the title of gran connestabile from Queen Joan, and serving as assistant to the Kingdom's commander-in-chief Muzio Attendolo Sforza. When the latter drowned before the Battle of L'Aquila in 1424, Caldora led the Angevine army to victory.

He subsequently continued to defend the Anjou cause after Alfonso's return. In 1431 he was sent to fight against the excommunicated Colonna in southern Lazio, but he was bribed by them and remained inactive. When his protector Sergianni Caracciolo died, and the marriage of his daughter Maria to Francesco Sforza was annulled by Pope Martin V, he returned to his lands.

He died during a siege at Colle Sannita, near Benevento. He was buried by his family in a chapel of the Abbey of the Holy Spirit (also known as Badia Morronese), near Sulmona. This chapel and an elaborate sarcophagus was built by his mother for the family in 1412.

His son Antonio Caldora was also a successful condottiero who later sided with the Anjou faction against Ferdinand of Aragon. This led to his defeat and the end of the Caldora dynasty at the Siege of Vasto in 1464.

Sources 
 

1369 births
1439 deaths
14th-century condottieri
Lords of Italy
People from the Province of Isernia
14th-century Italian nobility
15th-century Italian nobility
15th-century condottieri